"Sometimes" is a song by English synth-pop duo Erasure, released on 6 October 1986 as their fourth single overall. Written by band members Vince Clarke and Andy Bell, it typifies the Erasure sound—an uptempo, dance-oriented pop tune accentuated by Clarke's phase distortion and analogue synthesizers and Bell's lyrics about being in love. The trumpet solo is performed by Guy Barker. After three commercial flops from their debut studio album Wonderland (1986), the single became Erasure's first bona fide hit, peaking at number one in South Africa, number two in their native United Kingdom and in Germany, and becoming a huge international hit. In the US, it became Erasure's second top-five hit on the US Billboard Hot Dance Music/Club Play chart, where it charted alongside "It Doesn't Have to Be" and peaked at number four. Peaking only at number 39 in the French Singles Chart, "Sometimes" still remains Erasure's last chart entry in France ever since. The single spent seventeen weeks in the UK singles chart—the duo's longest chart run for a single in that country—and was included on Erasure's second studio album The Circus (1987), released six months later in March 1987.

Critical reception
Chris Gerard from Metro Weekly wrote, "It remains one of their signature songs. It has the classic Erasure sound of the acoustic guitar providing rhythm over the electronic beat. It's easy to see why it was their first big hit – it's irresistibly catchy and singable."

Music video
The music video for the song showcases Erasure on a building rooftop — Clarke playing a resonator guitar and Bell singing — as they weave through white sheets hanging from a laundry line; near the end of the video rain starts to fall on the duo.

Track listings

7" single (MUTE51)
 "Sometimes"
 "Sexuality" (Single Mix)

12" single (12MUTE51)
 "Sometimes" (12" Mix)
 "Sexuality" (12" Mix)
 "Say What" (Remix)

Limited 12" single (L12MUTE 51)
 "Sometimes" (Shiver Mix)
 "Sexuality" (Private Mix)
 "Senseless" (Remix)

12" single (Sire 20614-0)
 "Sometimes" (Extended Mix) – 5:22
 "Sometimes" (Shiver Mix) – 7:30
 "It Doesn't Have to Be" (The Boop Oopa Doo Mix) – 7:12
 "Sexuality" (Private Mix) – 6:04

Cassette single (CMUTE51)
 "Sometimes"
 "Sexuality" (Single Mix)
 "Who Needs Love Like That"
 "Heavenly Action"
 "Oh L'amour"

CD single (CDMUTE51)
 "Sometimes"
 "Sexuality" (Single Mix)
 "Sometimes" (12" Mix)
 "Sexuality" (12" Mix)
 "Say What" (Remix)

Charts

Weekly charts

Year-end charts

References

External links

1986 singles
1986 songs
Erasure songs
Mute Records singles
Number-one singles in South Africa
Number-one singles in Spain
Song recordings produced by Flood (producer)
Songs written by Andy Bell (singer)
Songs written by Vince Clarke
UK Independent Singles Chart number-one singles